Gajalakshmi, also spelt as Gajalaxmi, is one of the most significant Ashtalakshmi aspects of the Hindu goddess of prosperity, Lakshmi.

Mythology 
In Hindu mythology, Gajalakshmi is regarded to have restored the wealth and power lost by Indra when she rose from the Samudra Manthana, the churning of the ocean. She is the form of the goddess who stands for animal wealth, as well as other symbols of wealth that represent strength.

Iconography 
In a sixth century BCE sculpture, the goddess is depicted holding a lotus in her left hand and a lotus cornucopia in her right hand. There are two lions at her feet, two elephants bathing her with life giving waters, and two female attendants to her left and right side holding flywhisks.

Depictions 
An image is found from the 2nd century BCE, possibly in Buddhist contexts,  and appears on the railings from the Buddhist site of Bharhut, from 125-100 BCE.  It appears on a 1st-century BCE coin of Azilises, and a 3rd-century CE coin from Kausambi. One or two elephants depicted alongside a woman symbolized the birth of Gautama Buddha.

Temples in Odisha in the classic local Kalinga architecture style very often have a figure of Gajalakshmi in lalitasana as their lalatabimba or central protective image over the doorway to a temple or the sanctuary. One of the tympana at the Temple of Bantãy Srĕi in Siem Reap, Cambodia, has a beautifully sculptured image of the Goddess Gajalakshmi in pink sandstone. Though over a thousand years old, this tympanum is in almost as good a state as it must been when created.

Gajalakshmi is worshipped in many places in Goa and Konkan as a fertility goddess, mostly under the names Gajantlakshmi, Gajalakshmi, Kelbai or Bhauka devi, by various Konkani communities as their tutelary deity.

According to Timothy Taylor, there might be a connection between the female deity with elephants portrayed on the Gundestrup cauldron and Gajalakshmi.

Gallery

Citations

References

Dictionary of Hindu Lore and Legend by Anna Dallapiccola

Lakshmi
Hindu iconography